Charley's Aunt (Swedish: Charleys tant) is a 1926 Swedish silent comedy film directed by Elis Ellis and starring Ellis, Ralph Forbes and Renée Björling. It is an adaptation of the 1882 play Charley's Aunt by Brandon Thomas.

The film's sets were designed by the art director Vilhelm Bryde.

Cast
 Elis Ellis as Lord Francourt Bobberley 
 Ralph Forbes as Jack Chesney 
 Olav Riégo as Charles Wykeham 
 Renée Björling as Kitty Werden 
 Inga Sundblad-Ellis as Annie Speetigue 
 Axel Hultman as Jeremias Speetigue 
 Sven Bergvall as Sir Francis Chesney 
 Magda Holm as Ella Delahay 
 Anna Bergvall as Dona Lucia d'Alvadorez 
 Gustaf Hjärne as Brasset

References

Bibliography
 Tommy Gustafsson. Masculinity in the Golden Age of Swedish Cinema: A Cultural Analysis of 1920s Films. McFarland, 2014.

External links

1926 films
Films set in Oxford
Swedish silent films
1926 comedy films
Swedish comedy films
Swedish films based on plays
Swedish black-and-white films
1920s Swedish films